{{Infobox newspaper
| name = Albuquerque Journal
| image = Albuquerque Journal front page.jpg
| caption = The Journals front page as it appeared on May 3, 2012.
| type = Daily newspaper
| format = Broadsheet
| foundation = 1880(as the Golden Gate)
| owners = Journal Publishing Company
| headquarters = Albuquerque, New Mexico, United States
| circulation = 96,825 Daily116,826 Sunday|
| editor = Editor-in-Chief, Karen Moses Senior Editor, Kent WalzManaging Editor, Dan HerreraPolitics and Government:  Steve Williams
| publisher = William P. Lang
| ISSN = 1526-5137
| website = abqjournal.com
}}
The Albuquerque Journal''' is the largest newspaper in the U.S. state of New Mexico.

History
The Golden Gate newspaper was founded in June 1880. In the fall of 1880, the owner of the Golden Gate died and Journal Publishing Company was created. Journal Publishing changed the paper name to Albuquerque Daily Journal and issued its first edition of the Albuquerque Daily Journal on October 14, 1880.

The Daily Journal was first published in Old Town Albuquerque, but in 1882 the publication moved to a single room in the so-called new town (or expanded Albuquerque) at Second and Silver streets near the railroad tracks. It was published on a single sheet of newsprint, folded to make four pages. Those pages were divided into five columns with small headlines. Advertising appeared on the front page. The Daily Journal was published in the evening until the first Territorial Fair opened in October 1881. On October 4 of that year, a morning Journal was published in order to record the day's events at the fair. The morning Daily Journal continued for six issues. The last issue was published on Sunday, October 9 – making it the first Sunday newspaper to appear in Albuquerque. In 1887, the Morning Journal was acquired by the Albuquerque Daily Democrat, a newspaper founded in Santa Fe which had moved to Albuquerque.

The newspaper's name changed in 1899 to the Albuquerque Journal-Democrat. A change in policy necessitated the dropping of "Democrat" from the paper's name in 1903, so the digest appeared again as the Albuquerque Morning Journal. The daily paper name was changed to the Albuquerque Journal in 1925 when an independent editorial policy was established.

A year later, Tom Pepperday bought the Journal. Under his watch, the paper branched out into broadcasting, leasing the state's oldest radio station, KOB, in 1932 before buying it outright in 1936. He built the state's first television station, KOB-TV, in 1948. 

Pepperday died in 1956, and his son-in-law, C. L. Lang, took over the paper. Tom Lang inherited the Journal upon his father's death in 1971, and handed it to his brother Bill in 2012. The Pepperday-Lang family has run the ‘'Journal’' for almost a century, making it one of the few family-owned papers in a city of Albuquerque's size.

Editions and sections
The Albuquerque Journal is published Monday through Saturday with a Sunday edition called the Sunday Journal. In addition to the Journal’s daily final edition, Journal Publishing, also, issues regional newspapers. These include the Journal North, El Defensor Chieftain in Socorro, the Rio Rancho Observer and Valencia County News-Bulletin.

Newspaper sections include news, advertising, comics, Business; Sports, Metro N.M., Health, Education, Food, Go, Fetch, VENUE (entertainment tabloid on Fridays), Drive (auto tabloid on Fridays), TVNow (TV book on Saturdays), and HomeStyle. Journal Publishing issues quarterly magazines within the Albuquerque Journal are Sage, and Fit and Live Well, as well as a variety of special sections throughout the year.

Sections of The Sunday Journal include Living, Arts, Books, Travel, Careers, Real Estate, Money, Dimension, and Wall Street Journal Business.

Journal Publishing has an online-digital edition of the daily Albuquerque Journal'' optimized for mobile viewing.

See also 
Media in Albuquerque, New Mexico

References

Mass media in Albuquerque, New Mexico
Newspapers published in New Mexico
Newspapers established in 1880
 
Daily newspapers published in the United States
1880 establishments in New Mexico Territory